Fenna Vanhoutte (born 6 July 1997) is a Belgian professional racing cyclist, who last rode for UCI Women's Team .

At the 2015 European Road Championships for juniors in Tartu, she tied for tenth place. She was 32nd at the 2015 UCI Road World Championships in the women's junior road race in Richmond, Virginia.

See also
 List of 2016 UCI Women's Teams and riders

References

External links
 
 Fenna Vanhoutte at Het Nieuwsblad 

1997 births
Living people
Belgian female cyclists
Place of birth missing (living people)
People from Roeselare
Cyclists from West Flanders
21st-century Belgian women